Frank Moss (born 1823, died c. 1883–84) was a free-born nineteenth-century African-American farmer and politician from Buckingham County, Virginia. He was the only Africa-American in Virginia to be a member of the Constitutional Convention, the Virginia Senate and the Virginia House of Delegates.

Early life
Moss was born in Buckingham County, Virginia of an African-American family that had been free for several generations. He married Amanda Moss (9 years younger than he), and they had a daughter Mary Moss (b. 1857) and sons Davy Moss (b. 1860), George Moss (b. 1862), Benjamin Moss (b. 1866) and Frank Moss (b. 1878), although by 1880 neither Mary nor Davy lived with their parents.

Career

Moss farmed in Buckingham County near the James River, with the nearest post office at Curdsville, Virginia. As a minister, he held a leadership position, particularly among African Americans in his county and neighboring Appomattox County.

In 1867, Buckingham County voters elected Moss to the Virginia Constitutional Convention of 1868. A Republican, he was the sole delegate for Buckingham County alone, although J. Henry Williams represented part of Buckingham County, together with Amherst and Nelson Counties, all in Virginia's central Piedmont region and during that convention.

After Virginia voters overwhelmingly approved the constitution crafted by that convention, Appomattox and Buckingham County voters elected Moss to the Virginia state Senate, where he served one term (a part-time position; during the 1869/70 and 1870/71 General Assembly sessions).

By the 1870 census, Moss owned 15 acres, and added to his landholding in 1875; the 1880 census enumerates his land as 25 acres tilled and 80 acres of woodland, appraising it as worth $600, with an additional $90 of livestock and $200 of equipment, so he was among the wealthier farmers in his district.

After redistricting of his senate district to include Fluvanna County, Moss ran for the House of Delegates instead. He was elected to succeed James H. Noble as Buckingham County's delegate and served one term. R.T. Hubard Jr. succeeded him on December 1, 1875.

Death
The dates and circumstances of his death and burial are unknown. A November 1883 newspaper report indicated that Moss was still active within the Republican Party of Buckingham County, while an August 1884 newspaper article described Moss as already being dead by that point.

See also
 African-American officeholders during and following the Reconstruction era

References

Bibliography

 also available at   

1823 births
Year of death unknown
Virginia state senators
Members of the Virginia House of Delegates
People from Buckingham County, Virginia